Li Fook-kow, CMG, JP (15 June 1922 – 27 October 2011) was a Hong Kong government official. He was the Secretary for Home Affairs and official member of the Executive Council and Legislative Council of Hong Kong.

Biography
Li was born on 15 June 1922 in Hong Kong to the Li family. His father, businessman and politician Li Tse-fong, founded the Bank of East Asia. Li Fook-kow was educated at the Massachusetts Institute of Technology. He joined the Hong Kong government as assistant education officer in 1954 and made a student officer. From 1972 to 1983, he was chief officerand the Director of Social Welfare from 1973 to 1977. He was also appointed Secretary for Home Affairs, holding the post from 1977 to 1980. After retirement from government, he became chairman of the Public Service Commission from 1980 and 1987. From March to October 1987, he was appointed Public Opinion Survey Office Monitor for the controversial constitutional reform on the 1988 Legislative Council election.

Personal life
Li was a Roman Catholic. He married Edith Kwong Mei-yung in 1946, and they had two sons and two daughters. His son Andrew Li Kwok-nang was the first Chief Justice of the Court of Final Appeal, from 1997 to 2010. His other children are daughters Carol and Elaine and son Michael Li Ka-wah. Li migrated to Canada before 1997 but later moved back to Hong Kong. He died at the Ruttonjee Hospital at the age of 89 on 27 October 2011.

See also
 Four big families of Hong Kong

References

1922 births
2011 deaths
Massachusetts Institute of Technology alumni
Government officials of Hong Kong
Members of the Executive Council of Hong Kong
Members of the Legislative Council of Hong Kong
Hong Kong Roman Catholics
Hong Kong emigrants to Canada
Companions of the Order of St Michael and St George
Li family of Hong Kong